Believers is a 2007 thriller film directed by Daniel Myrick and written by Myrick, Julia Fair and Daniel Noah. The film was distributed by Warner Bros. as a straight-to-DVD release in the United States and elsewhere.

Plot
While on duty, two emergency paramedics, David Vaughn and Victor Hernandez, receive a call from a young girl named Libby, whose mother has lost consciousness in a deserted area. However, when they arrive there they are captured by members of a cult called the Quanta Group.

The two men discover that the Quanta Group is composed of scientists, philosophers and mathematicians and led by a man who  calls himself "The Teacher". The Quanta Group believes that the end of the world is coming soon and is preparing for a mass suicide. While Victor is seduced by the group, David must try to escape and save his friend before it is too late.

Cast
 Johnny Messner as David Vaughn
 Jon Huertas as Victor Hernandez
 Deanna Russo as Rebecca
 Saige Ryan Campbell as Libby
 Elizabeth Bogush as Deborah
 Erik Passoja as Io
 Dig Wayne as Captain Edward Newsome
 John Wesley as The Leader
 Christopher May as Gas Station Attendant
 Carolyn Hennesy as Lina Vance
 Daniel Benzali as The Teacher
 June Angela as Mara
 John Farley as Glasses
 Ciara Bravo as Jade

Notes

External links
 
 
 
 

2007 films
2007 direct-to-video films
Films shot in Los Angeles
American independent films
2007 thriller films
American thriller films
2007 independent films
Films directed by Daniel Myrick
Films with screenplays by Daniel Myrick
Films produced by Daniel Myrick
2000s English-language films
2000s American films